A Lager is a type of beer.

Lager may also refer to:

 Nazi concentration camps, or  Konzentrationslager, abbreviated Lager
 Gulag, Soviet prison camps 
 Låger, a dialect of the Ladin language

People
 Bengt Lager (born 1951), Swedish modern pentathlete
 Brad Lager (born 1975), American politician from Missouri
 Fritjof Lager (1905–1973), Swedish communist politician
 Gunnar Lager (1888–1960), Swedish rower
 Hans Lager (born 1952), Swedish modern pentathlete
 Kris Lager, American blues rock musician
 John Lager (1887–1961), Swedish rower

See also
 Saint-Lager, French commune
 Lagger, surname